Oleg Ivanovich Betin (born August 25, 1950) is a governor of Tambov Oblast in Russia. He was a member of Our Home – Russia party.  In 1995 he became governor. He was re-elected on December 7, 2003 with around 70% of the votes cast. Under Betin, Tambov Oblast provided food shipments to war-torn Chechnya in 2000.

Awards and honors
 Order of Honour (2000)
 Order For Merit to the Fatherland 4th class (2004)
 Order For Merit to the Fatherland 3rd class (2010)

References

1950 births
Living people
People from Tambov
Governors of Tambov Oblast
Communist Party of the Soviet Union members
United Russia politicians
21st-century Russian politicians
Recipients of the Order "For Merit to the Fatherland", 3rd class
Recipients of the Order of Honour (Russia)